The Flora of Ashmore and Cartier Islands consists of 16 families, 23 genera and 27 species. Four of these species are introduced and naturalised. In addition, two species have been introduced but not naturalised. The vegetation is dominated by shrubs, grasses and creepers. The vast majority of species have seeds that are very easily transported by the wind, birds or the sea.

Flora of Ashmore Reef
The following plant taxa occur on the islands of Ashmore Reef:

In addition to these, Zea mays (Maize) and Cocos nucifera (Coconut) have been introduced by visiting Indonesian fishermen as food sources, but these are not naturalised.

Flora of Cartier Island
Cartier Island is unvegetated. The only recorded plant is the seagrass Thallassia hemprichii, which forms meadows in pockets of sand among the reef.

References
 

 
Lists of biota of Western Australia
Lists of plants of Australia